|}

The Thyestes Chase is a National Hunt handicap steeplechase run in Ireland. It takes place at Gowran Park, Gowran, County Kilkenny in January, over a distance of about 3 miles and 1 furlong (5,029 metres) and during the race there are 17 fences to be jumped. The race is usually contested by horses who go on to run in the Grand National and has been won in recent years by two horses who have gone on to win the Grand National, in Hedgehunter and Numbersixvalverde.  The most famous winners of the race were Arkle (1964) and Flyingbolt (1966). It currently has a maximum field of 18 runners. The race is sponsored by bloodstock auctioneers Goffs.

History 
The race has been won by three time Cheltenham Gold Cup winner Arkle (1964), Irish Grand National & Queen Mother Champion Chase winner Flyingbolt (1966) and Aintree Grand National winners Hedgehunter (2005) and Numbersixvalverde (2006). The race takes its name from the racehorse, Thyestes, named after a figure from Greek mythology. Thyestes, by The Tetrarch (out of Tetratema), was bred by Major Victor McCalmont of Mount Juliet and trained by Atty Persse at Stockbridge, Wiltshire. Thyestes was rated the third-best two-year-old of 1930 as a result of his winning his only two races, the National Breeders Produce Stakes over 5 furlongs at Sandown Park and the Rous Memorial Stakes over 6 furlongs at Goodwood. Thyestes never ran again due to injury and was retired to stud in Yorkshire. 
The Thyestes trophy was presented to the Kilkenny Show by Major Dermot McCalmont for a 5-year-old likely to make a good hunter. The trophy was won by a horse owned by Mr John McEnery of Rossenarra Stud, Kells, County Kilkenny and ridden by his son Martin. The McEnery family then presented it to Gowran Park for the first running of the Thyestes Chase in 1954.

Records
Most successful horse since 1988 (2 wins):
 Wylde Hide – 1995, 1996
 Bob Treacy - 1999, 2001
 Priests Leap- 2008, 2009
 On His Own -  2012, 2014

Leading jockey since 1988 (3 wins):
 David Casey – 	This Is Serious (2002), Hedgehunter (2004), On His Own (2012)

Leading trainer since 1988 (9 wins):
 Willie Mullins - '' Micko's Dream (2000), Hedgehunter (2004), Homer Wells (2007), On His Own (2012, 2014), Djakadam (2015), Invitation Only (2019), Total Recall (2020), Carefully Selected (2023)

Recent winners

See also
 Horse racing in Ireland
 List of Irish National Hunt races

References

Racing Post:
1988, 1989, 1990, 1991, 1992, 1993, 1994, 1995, 1996, 1997
1998, 1999, 2000, 2001, 2002, 2003, 2004, 2005, 2006, 2007
2008, 2009, 2010, 

National Hunt races in Ireland
National Hunt chases
Gowran Park Racecourse